Thompson House was located on the corner of Glover and Penn Streets in Woodbury, Gloucester County, New Jersey, United States. The house was bought by John W. Thompson, glassblower, in 1885, and used as a specialty grocery store from that time until 1956.  It was added to the National Register of Historic Places on July 13, 1988. It burned down on January 14, 2012.

See also
National Register of Historic Places listings in Gloucester County, New Jersey

References

Houses on the National Register of Historic Places in New Jersey
Houses completed in 1892
Houses in Gloucester County, New Jersey
National Register of Historic Places in Gloucester County, New Jersey
Woodbury, New Jersey
New Jersey Register of Historic Places